Lachlan Patrick McCaffrey (born 17 March 1990 in Sydney, Australia) is an Australian rugby union player for the Austin Gilgronis of Major League Rugby (MLR). His regular playing position is Number Eight.

McCaffrey was part of the  Extended Playing squad, having previously represented the Western Force in Super Rugby. He joined the Perth based side ahead of the 2012 Super Rugby season and is awaiting his first-team debut. He previously played of the Waratahs. McCaffrey went to Saint Ignatius' College, Riverview in Sydney, and also plays for Eastwood in the Sydney Shute Shield grade rugby competition.

McCaffrey was a member of the Australia under 20 team that competed in the 2010 IRB Junior World Championship.

He moved to English Premiership side London Welsh prior to the 2014–15 season. On 5 May 2015, Lachlan signed for Leicester Tigers for the upcoming 2015–16 season.
Since signing for the Tigers, McCaffrey has gone on to become an integral part of the Leicester pack.

In 2018, McCaffrey will once again join the Brumbies having agreed on a contract to return to the Canberra-based club.

Politics
He contested the Division of Bennelong at the 2013 Australian federal election for the Democratic Labour Party. He won 0.70% of the vote, incumbent conservative MP John Alexander easily retained the seat.

Reference List

External links
Leicester Tigers Profile
Western Force profile
itsrugby.co.uk profile

Living people
1990 births
Australian rugby union players
Rugby union players from Sydney
Rugby union flankers
New South Wales Waratahs players
Western Force players
ACT Brumbies players
London Welsh RFC players
Australian expatriate rugby union players
Australian expatriate sportspeople in England
Expatriate rugby union players in England
Leicester Tigers players
Rugby union number eights
Kyuden Voltex players
Austin Gilgronis players